Roosteren is a village in the Dutch province of Limburg. It is located in the municipality of Echt-Susteren.

The village was first mentioned in 1201 as Rustern. The etymology is unclear. Roosteren developed in the Middle Ages as a linear settlement. In the 13th century, it became part of the Duchy of Guelders. The centre moved to the hamlet Scheiereynde where a church was built.

The St Jacobus de Meerdere Church is a three-aisled neoclassic church which was in 1843. It was damaged during World War II and restored in 1946. Eyckholt Castle is a late-16th century estate. A tower was added in the 19th century. Ter Borch Castle (also Roosterborch) was built around 1880 and the location of a 15th century which was demolished in 1632. 

Roosteren was home to 746 people in 1840. It was a separate municipality until 1982, when it was merged with Susteren. In 2003, it was merged into Echt-Susteren.

Gallery

Notable people
 Harry Bekkering, cultural scientist (born 1944)
 Jerome Lambrechts, politician (1839–1896)
 Paul Peters, politician (born 1942)
 Mathieu Pustjens, racing cyclist (born 1948)
 Sjra Schoffelen, sculptor (born 1937)

References

Populated places in Limburg (Netherlands)
Former municipalities of Limburg (Netherlands)
Belgium–Netherlands border crossings
Echt-Susteren